The men's 110 metres hurdles event at the 1951 Pan American Games was held at the Estadio Monumental in Buenos Aires on 2 and 3 March.

Medalists

Results

Heats

Final

References

Athletics at the 1951 Pan American Games
1951